Llaneros FC may refer to:

Llaneros de Guanare, Venezuela
Llaneros F.C., Colombia